Rabastens is a commune in the Tarn department in southern France. The historian Gustave de Clausade (1815–1888) was born in Rabastens of which he became mayor in 1848.

Population

Transport 
Rabastens-Couffouleux station has rail connections to Toulouse, Albi and Rodez.

See also 
Communes of the Tarn department

References 

Communes of Tarn (department)
World Heritage Sites in France